Mahamadou Amadou Sabo (born 30 May 2000) is a Nigerien professional footballer who plays as a midfielder for Club Africain.

International career
He was first called up to the Niger national football team in November 2019, but remained on the bench. He made his debut for the squad on 5 June 2021 in a friendly against The Gambia. In June 2022, Sabo scored another goal during a 1 to 1 tie with Uganda.

Career statistics

Club

Notes

International

 Scores and results list Niger's goal tally first, score column indicates score after each Sabo goal.

References

2000 births
Living people
Nigerien footballers
Niger youth international footballers
Niger international footballers
Association football midfielders
AS SONIDEP players
CA Bizertin players
Nigerien expatriate footballers
Expatriate footballers in Tunisia